Sclafani Bagni (Sicilian: Sclàfani Bagni) is a comune (municipality) in the Metropolitan City of Palermo in the Italian region Sicily, located about  southeast of Palermo.

Geography
Sclafani Bagni borders the following municipalities: Alia, Aliminusa, Caccamo, Caltavuturo, Castronovo di Sicilia, Cerda, Montemaggiore Belsito, Polizzi Generosa, Scillato, Valledolmo, Vallelunga Pratameno.

Main sights

Mother Church of Santa Maria Assunta. Of medieval origins, it was renewed in the 14th and 17th century. It houses paintings from the 16th and 17th centuries.
Churches of St. Philip and St. James, both first mentioned in 1573.
Remains of the medieval castle.

References

External links

 Official website

Municipalities of the Metropolitan City of Palermo